In enzymology, a prephenate dehydrogenase (NADP+) is an enzyme that catalyzes the chemical reaction

prephenate + NADP+  4-hydroxyphenylpyruvate + CO2 + NADPH

Thus, the two substrates of this enzyme are prephenate and NADP+, whereas its 3 products are 4-hydroxyphenylpyruvate, CO2, and NADPH.

This enzyme belongs to the family of oxidoreductases, specifically those acting on the CH-CH group of donor with NAD+ or NADP+ as acceptor.  The systematic name of this enzyme class is prephenate:NADP+ oxidoreductase (decarboxylating). Other names in common use include prephenate dehydrogenase, prephenate (nicotinamide adenine dinucleotide phosphate), dehydrogenase, and prephenate dehydrogenase (NADP).  This enzyme participates in phenylalanine, tyrosine and tryptophan biosynthesis.

References

 

EC 1.3.1
NADPH-dependent enzymes
Enzymes of unknown structure